John Maxwell Coghlan (December 8, 1835 – March 26, 1879) was a California Republican politician who represented California's 3rd congressional district in the 42nd United States Congress.

Biography 
Coghlan was born in Louisville, Kentucky and moved with his parents to Illinois in 1847, and again in 1850 to California during the California Gold Rush, where they settled in Suisun City.

Coghlan studied law and was admitted to the bar and practiced in Suisun City. He was a member of the California State Assembly from 1865 to 1867, representing Napa and Lake counties. He was elected as a Republican to the 42nd Congress (1871–1873), but lost his bid for reelection in 1872 to Democrat John K. Luttrell.

He was the United States Attorney for the Northern District of California from 1876 to 1878, and was appointed Chief Justice of the Territorial Utah Supreme Court, and confirmed by the United States Senate, but declined to serve. He practiced law in Oakland, California until his death in 1879. He is buried in Mountain View Cemetery.

References

External links

 The Political Graveyard

1835 births
1879 deaths
Republican Party members of the California State Assembly
People from Suisun City, California
Politicians from Louisville, Kentucky
Republican Party members of the United States House of Representatives from California
19th-century American politicians
People from Oakland, California
United States Attorneys for the Northern District of California
Utah Territorial judges
19th-century American judges